Sawyer Brown is an American country music band founded in 1984. Their discography comprises 18 studio albums, one live album, and five compilation albums. Of their albums, three have been certified gold by the RIAA: 1992's The Dirt Road,  1993's Outskirts of Town and 1995's Greatest Hits 1990-1995. The latter two are certified gold by the CRIA, as is their 1990 Greatest Hits album, while 1989's The Boys Are Back is certified platinum by the CRIA.

Sawyer Brown has also released 60 singles, of which 51 have charted on the Billboard Hot Country Songs chart between 1984 and 2005. Three of their singles have topped this chart: "Step That Step" in 1985, "Some Girls Do" in 1992, and "Thank God for You" in 1993. Sixteen additional singles have reached Top Ten on the same chart.

Studio albums

1980s

1990s

2000s and 2010s

Compilation albums

Live albums

Singles

1980s

1990s

2000s and 2010s

Christmas singles

Videography

Music videos

Notes

References

Country music discographies
Discographies of American artists